AR2 may refer to:

 AR2 (train), European railbus
 Arkhangelsky Ar-2, Soviet dive bomber
 Arkansas's 2nd congressional district
 Arkansas Highway 2
 Dorand AR2, a French two-seater aircraft of World War I, also converted to a two-casualty ambulance version
 Ar2, the chemical formula for diargon

See also
 SAR (IPCC), the IPCC Second Assessment Report (aka AR2)